Moderate conservatism is a moderate version of conservatism. Moderate conservatism is less demanding than classical conservatism and has several subtypes such as liberal conservatism. 

The term is often used in countries where the political camp is divided into 'liberals' (mainly left-liberals) and (right-wing) 'conservatives' rather than countries where divided into 'social democrats' and 'right-wing opponents'. For countries belonging to the former, the term "moderate liberalism" is sometimes contrasted with the term "moderate conservatism". The term can be applied in the United States, Poland, South Korea, Japan, etc.

Overview
The term "moderate conservative" is not often used in most parts of Europe, where social democracy or socialist parties have grown into major parties since the early 20th century, because moderate conservatives in many European countries are liberal conservatives or Christian democrats. However, the term has historically been widely used in Europe, particularly in the mid-19th and earlier century, when liberal-to-radical politics formed the mainstream left in Europe and conservatives were the right opposition. The "moderate conservatives" of this period were contrasted with the "moderate liberals".

The term 'moderate conservatism' is also used as a contrast to 'ultra-conservatism'.

By country

Canada

The main factions of the Conservative Party of Canada are the "Red Tory" and "Blue Tory". Blue Tory values free markets and is less culturally liberal, while Red Tory is more economically and socially moderate.

Japan
Kōchikai faction that represents moderate conservatives within the right-wing Liberal Democratic Party. Current Japanese prime minister Fumio Kishida, is a member of the Kōchikai faction, and he is also a "moderate conservative".

Yomiuri Shimbun, a moderately conservative newspaper. Yomiuri Shimbun places more emphasis on moderate pro-American diplomacy (than hawkish Japanese nationalism).

Poland 
The Civic Platform has supported a moderate conservative agenda. The party is described in various ways in the Polish political context as centre-right, centrist and centre-left.

South Korea
20th century, the term "liberal" in South Korea had the opposite meaning of "socialist" or "left-wing". Therefore, some historical liberals in the South Korea were considered "conservatives" or "moderate conservatives".

Ahn Cheol-soo was considered "centrist reformist" or "centrist liberal" (sometimes "centre-left") in the early and mid 2010s, but is now classified as "centre-right" and "moderate conservative". Park Heong-joon and Yoo Seung-min are representative "moderate conservatives".

The JoongAng Ilbo, a South Korean media outlet, is considered moderate conservative.

Sweden
The major traditional right-wing party in Sweden was initially called the Conservative Party and later the Rightist Party, before adopting the name the Moderate Party in 1969 in order to shed its ultra-conservative image and espouse more classical liberal politics.

United States
The Republican Main Street Partnership is a Republican Party organization for moderate conservatives. Examples include Senator Susan Collins, Former Maryland Governor Larry Hogan and Representative Juan Ciscomani. It has historically been associated with Rockefeller Republicans.

Sometimes moderate conservatives are called "Republicans in Name Only" by right-leaning conservatives.

Moderate conservative political parties and caucuses 
 Canada: Red Tory (Tories faction)
 Japan: Kōchikai (LDP faction), Komeito
 Poland: Civic Platform
 Sweden: Moderate Party
 United Kingdom: One Nation Conservatives (Tories faction)
 United States: Republican Main Street Partnership (GOP faction)

See also 
 Centre-right politics
 Liberal conservatism
 One-nation conservatism

References

Conservatism
Centre-right ideologies
Right-wing ideologies
Centrism